The Turbomeca Aspin was a small French turbofan engine produced by Turbomeca in the early 1950s. This geared turbofan design was the first turbofan to fly, powering the Fouga Gemeaux test-bed aircraft on 2 January 1952.

Variants
Aspin I
200 kg (440 lb) thrust 
Aspin II
350 kg (770 lb) thrust

Applications
Fouga CM.88 Gemeaux

Specifications (Aspin II)

See also

References
Notes

Bibliography

 Gunston, Bill. World Encyclopedia of Aero Engines. Cambridge, England. Patrick Stephens Limited, 1989. 
 Wilkinson, Paul H. 'Aircraft engines of the World 1953''. London, England. Sir Isaac Pitman & Sons Limited. 1953.

External links
Minijets website Aspin I
Minijets website Aspin II

Aspin
1950s turbofan engines
Geared turbofan engines
Centrifugal-flow turbojet engines